The voiceless velar lateral fricative is a rare speech sound. As one element of an affricate, it is found for example in Zulu and Xhosa (see velar lateral ejective affricate). However, a simple fricative has only been reported from a few languages in the Caucasus and New Guinea.

Archi, a Northeast Caucasian language of Dagestan, has four voiceless velar lateral fricatives: plain , labialized , fortis , and labialized fortis . Although clearly fricatives, these are further forward than velars in most languages, and might better be called prevelar. Archi also has a voiced fricative, as well as a voiceless and several ejective lateral velar affricates, but no alveolar lateral fricatives or affricates.

In New Guinea, some of the Chimbu–Wahgi languages such as Melpa, Middle Wahgi, and Nii, have a voiceless velar lateral fricative, which they write with a double-bar el (Ⱡ, ⱡ). This sound also appears in syllable coda position as an allophone of the voiced velar lateral fricative in Kuman.

The IPA proper has no separate symbol for these sounds, but they can be transcribed as a devoiced raised velar lateral approximant,  (here the devoicing ring diacritic is placed above the letter to avoid clashing with the raising diacritic). By analogy with existing IPA laterals, a small capital Ɬ is used in the extIPA:

 was added to Unicode in 2021.

Some scholars also posit the voiceless velar lateral approximant distinct from the fricative.

Features
Features of the voiceless velar lateral fricative:

Occurrence

Notes

References

 

Lateral consonants
Pulmonic consonants
Voiceless oral consonants
Velar consonants